Dul-e Bozorg Khan Ahmad (also Romanized as Dūl-e Bozorg Khān Aḩmad) is a village in Babuyi Rural District, Basht District, Basht County, Kohgiluyeh and Boyer-Ahmad Province, Iran. At the 2006 census, its population was 41, in 11 families.

References 

Populated places in Basht County